The year 1926 in science and technology involved some significant events, listed below.

Astronomy and space exploration
 March 16 – Robert Goddard launches the first liquid-fueled rocket, at Auburn, Massachusetts. This was considered by some to be the start of the space age, although his rocket did not reach outer space.

Biology
 American microbiologist Selman Waksman publishes Enzymes.
 The Quarterly Review of Biology is established by Raymond Pearl in the United States.

Chemistry
 Waldo Semon and the B.F. Goodrich Company develop a method of plasticizing polyvinyl chloride, giving it commercial potential.
 Phencyclidine (PCP, angel dust) is first synthesized.

Earth sciences 
 Vladimir Vernadsky popularises the concept of the biosphere in a book (in Russian) of this title.

Exploration
 May 12 – Roald Amundsen, Umberto Nobile and crew fly over the North Pole in the airship Norge.

Mathematics
 Otakar Borůvka publishes Borůvka's algorithm, introducing the greedy algorithm.

Medicine
 First vaccine for pertussis.
 American biogerontologist Raymond Pearl publishes his book Alcohol and Longevity demonstrating that drinking alcohol in moderation is associated with greater longevity than either abstaining or drinking heavily.
 Finnish physician Erik Adolf von Willebrand first describes Hereditär pseudohemofili ("Hereditary pseudohemophilia"), later known as Von Willebrand disease.
 German-Jewish dermatologist Walter Freudenthal gives the earliest clear histopathological description of keratoma senile (actinic keratosis), distinguishing it from verruca senilis (seborrheic keratosis), in Breslau.
 The description 'glioblastoma multiforme' is introduced by Percival Bailey and Harvey Cushing.

Meteorology
 Wasaburo Oishi first describes the jet stream.

Paleontology
 Gerhard Heilmann publishes The Origin of Birds (in English) on bird evolution.

Physics
 Wolfgang Pauli uses Werner Heisenberg's matrix theory of quantum mechanics to derive the observed spectrum of the hydrogen atom.

Technology
 January 26 – Scottish inventor John Logie Baird demonstrates his pioneering greyscale mechanical television system (which he calls a "televisor") at his London laboratory for members of the Royal Institution and a reporter from The Times.
 February – Hidetsugu Yagi and Shintaro Uda publish the first description of the Yagi–Uda antenna.
 June 28 – A patent for an electric percussion fuse for explosive projectiles, invented by Herbert Rühlemann, is filed in Germany.
 July
 Alan A. Griffith publishes An Aerodynamic Theory of Turbine Design, proposing an airfoil shape for turbine blades.
 Carl Zeiss, Jena, open a planetarium housed in a geodesic dome designed by Walther Bauersfeld.
 November 23 – The aerosol spray can is patented by Erik Rotheim, a Norwegian chemical engineer.
 The Einstein refrigerator is invented by Albert Einstein and Leo Szilard.
 Ulster-born engineer Harry Ferguson is granted a British patent for his 'Duplex' hitch linking tractor and plough.
 German engineer Andreas Stihl patents and develops an electric chainsaw.

Awards
 Nobel Prizes
 Physics – Jean Baptiste Perrin
 Chemistry – Theodor Svedberg
 Medicine – Johannes Andreas Grib Fibiger
 Copley Medal: Frederick Hopkins
 Wollaston Medal for Geology: Henry Fairfield Osborn

Births
 January 11 – Lev Dyomin (died 1998), Soviet Russian cosmonaut.
 January 29 – Abdus Salam (died 1996), Punjabi theoretical physicist.
 February – David Medved (died 2009), American physicist.
 March 7 – Margaret Weston (died 2021), English electrical engineer and Director of the Science Museum, London.
 April 3 – Gus Grissom (died 1967), American astronaut.
 May 1 – Eva Siracká (died 2023), Slovak physician
 May 8 – David Attenborough, English broadcaster and naturalist.
 May 17 – Franz Sondheimer (died 1981), German-born British chemist
 June 19 – Erna Schneider Hoover, American computer technologist.
 June 23 – Lawson Soulsby (died 2017), English parasitologist.
 July 27 – W. David Kingery (died 2000), American materials scientist specializing in ceramic materials.
 July 31 
 Bernard Nathanson (died 2011), American medical doctor and activist.
 Hilary Putnam (died 2016), American philosopher, mathematician and computer scientist.
 September 4 – George William Gray (died 2013), Scottish chemist, discoverer of stable liquid crystal materials leading to the development of liquid-crystal displays.
 September 7 – Donald Pinkel, American pediatric hematologist and oncologist.
 September 15 – Jean-Pierre Serre, French mathematician.
 October 2 – Michio Suzuki (died 1998), Japanese mathematician.
 October 12 – Ruth L. Kirschstein (died 2009), American pathologist and science administrator at the National Institutes of Health.
 October 31 – Narinder Singh Kapany (died 2020), Punjabi-born physicist.
 November 29 – Dilhan Eryurt (died 2012), Turkish astrophysicist.
 December 10 – Neena Schwartz (died 2018), American endocrinologist.

Deaths
 March 5 – Clément Ader (born 1841), French engineer and inventor, airplane pioneer.
 April 11 – Luther Burbank (born 1849), American plant breeder.
 May 8 – Stephen Paget (born 1855), English surgeon.
 July 21 – Washington Roebling (born 1837), American civil engineer.
 September 23 – Paul Kammerer (born 1880), Austrian Lamarckian biologist (suicide).
 October 7 – Emil Kraepelin (born 1856), German psychiatrist.
 October 10 – Clara H. Hasse (born 1880), American botanist.
 October 19 – Victor Babeș (born 1854), Romanian physician and bacteriologist.
 November 26 – John Browning (born 1855), American firearms designer.

References

 
20th century in science
1920s in science